Daxata ustulata is a species of beetle in the family Cerambycidae. It was described by Francis Polkinghorne Pascoe in 1866. It is known from Thailand, Borneo, Sumatra and Malaysia.

References

Pteropliini
Beetles described in 1866